Manhal Aziz Al-Habbobi (Arabic: منهل عزيز الحبوبي; born 5 September 1970) is an Iraqi architect and former Mayor of Baghdad. Recognised for his deeply philosophical approach to architecture, his style is said to promote a contemporary vision of Mesopotamian heritage. In September 2020, he was appointed Mayor of Baghdad, where he served the city until his resignation in late October. During that time, it was announced that he was independent from any specific political party.

Early life and education 
Manhal Aziz Al-Habbobi was born on the 5th of September, 1970 in Baghdad, Iraq. He studied architectural engineering at the University of Baghdad and graduated in 1995 then continued for his Master's degree in Philosophy of Architecture (2000).

Career 
Al-Habbobi has been practising architecture for over 25 years, and has participated in several design competitions, the most notable of which being the design bid for the Iraqi General Secretariat of the Council of Ministers, where his award-winning design won first prize over that of the late Zaha Hadid’s as well as over thirty other international and local entries. He was then invited to go through the thought process behind his winning design in the first TED talks event in Baghdad.

On the 20th of September 2020, after being appointed by the Iraqi prime minister, Mustafa Al-Kadhimi, Al-Habbobi formally took up office as the Mayor of Baghdad, superseding Zekra Alwash and preceding the current mayor, Alaa' Al-Amary. During that time, he had been announced to be independent from any specific political party. However, his term proved short-lived when on the 27th of October 2020, he issued his resignation letter.

References

Living people
Iraqi architects
Mayors of Baghdad
1970 births
University of Baghdad alumni